Hamid Fazeli (Mohsen Kafi) is the fifth president of the Iranian Space Agency (ISA) to have been appointed since its establishment. He holds a Ph.D. degree in Mechanics from the Sharif University of Technology in Tehran. He was president of the Iran Aerospace Research Institute (ARI) since February 2009 before his appointment as the president of ISA.

References

Living people
Administrators of the Iranian Space Agency
Year of birth missing (living people)
Place of birth missing (living people)